The 14th BET Awards were held at the Nokia Theatre L.A. Live in Los Angeles, California on June 29, 2014. Chris Rock was unveiled as the host for the upcoming BET Awards on May 14 during the network's 106 & Park music video countdown show. Beyoncé lead the nominations with 6, followed by Jay-Z with 5. Drake, Pharrell Williams and August Alsina were tied for 4. Beyoncé was the big winner of the night winning 3 BET Awards, while Nicki Minaj, Drake, August Alsina and Pharrell Williams with 2.

Performers

Main Show

BET Music Matters Stage Performers
Gabi Wilson
Adrian Marcel
Sebastian Mikael

Presenters
Bow Wow
Keshia Chanté
Regina Hall
Kevin Hart
Keke Palmer
Larenz Tate
Gabrielle Union
Kerry Washington
Nick Cannon
Zendaya
Regina Hall
Eva Marcille
Terrence J

Nominations

Best Female R&B/Pop Artist
Beyoncé 
Tamar Braxton
Janelle Monáe 
Jhené Aiko 
K. Michelle 
Rihanna

Best Male R&B/Pop Artist
Pharrell Williams
John Legend
August Alsina 
Chris Brown 
Justin Timberlake

Best Group
TGT
A$AP Mob 
Daft Punk 
Macklemore & Ryan Lewis 
Young Money

Best Collaboration
Beyoncé featuring Jay Z – "Drunk in Love"
August Alsina featuring Trinidad Jame$ - "I Luv This Shit" 
Drake featuring Majid Jordan – "Hold On, We're Going Home"
Robin Thicke featuring T.I. and Pharrell Williams – "Blurred Lines"
Jay Z featuring Justin Timberlake – "Holy Grail"  
YG featuring Jeezy and Rich Homie Quan – "My Hitta"

Coca-Cola Viewers' Choice Award
August Alsina featuring Trinidad Jame$ – "I Luv This Shit" 
Beyoncé featuring Jay Z – "Drunk in Love"
Drake – "Worst Behavior"
Jhené Aiko – "The Worst"
Pharrell Williams – "Happy"

Best Male Hip Hop Artist
Drake
Kendrick Lamar 
J. Cole 
Future 
Jay Z

Best Female Hip Hop Artist
Nicki Minaj
Angel Haze 
Charli Baltimore 
Eve 
Iggy Azalea

Video of the Year
Beyoncé – "Partition" 
Beyoncé featuring Jay Z – "Drunk in Love" 
Chris Brown – "Fine China" 
Drake –  "Worst Behavior" 
Pharrell Williams –  "Happy"

Video Director of the Year
Hype Williams
Benny Boom 
Colin Tilley 
Director X 
Chris Brown

Best New Artist
August Alsina
Ariana Grande
Mack Wilds 
Rich Homie Quan
ScHoolboy Q

Best Gospel Artist
Donnie McClurkin 
 Erica Campbell
Hezekiah Walker 
Tamela Mann
Tye Tribbett

Best Actress
Lupita Nyong'o 
Angela Bassett 
Oprah Winfrey
Kerry Washington 
Gabrielle Union

Best Actor
Chiwetel Ejiofor
Forest Whitaker 
Idris Elba 
Kevin Hart 
Michael B. Jordan

YoungStars Award
Gabrielle Douglas 
Jacob Latimore 
Jaden Smith
Keke Palmer 
Zendaya

Best Movie
12 Years a Slave 
Lee Daniels' The Butler
The Best Man Holiday 
Fruitvale Station 
Kevin Hart: Let Me Explain

Subway Sportswoman of the Year
Brittney Griner 
Lolo Jones 
Serena Williams
Venus Williams
Skylar Diggins

Subway Sportsman of the Year
Blake Griffin 
Carmelo Anthony 
Floyd Mayweather Jr. 
Kevin Durant
LeBron James

Centric Award
Aloe Blacc – "The Man"
Jennifer Hudson featuring T.I. – "I Can't Describe (The Way I Feel)"
Jhené Aiko – "The Worst"
Liv Warfield – "Why Do You Lie?"
Wale feat Sam Dew – "LoveHate Thing"

FANdemonium Award
Beyoncé
Trey Songz
Rihanna
Justin Timberlake

Best International Act: Africa
Davido
Diamond Platnumz  
Mafikizolo 
Sarkodie  
Tiwa Savage
Toofan

Best International Act: UK
Krept and Konan
Dizzee Rascal 
Ghetts 
Laura Mvula 
Tinie Tempah
Rita Ora

References

External links
Official Site

BET Awards
2014 music awards